Mouna Poratam (The Silent War or The Silent Struggle) is a 1989 Indian drama film directed by Mohan Gandhi, starring Yamuna and Vinod Kumar, with music composed by S. Janaki.  The movie is based on the real-life story of Sabita Badhei, which gained massive media coverage.  It tells the story of a tribal girl, Durga (portrayed by Yamuna), who is betrayed by a government officer and fights for her conjugal rights, seeking marital recognition to give proper identity to her illegitimate child.  The government intervened to appoint a Lok Adalat to give speedy justice in this case.  Both Yamuna and Vinod were introduced by Ushakiran Movies in this film. The film won two Nandi Awards. A sequel for the film is going to appear as a serial from 4 April 2022 on ETV under the same title

Cast
 Yamuna as Durga
 Vinod Kumar as Rajasekharam
 Kota Srinivasa Rao
 Mallikarjuna Rao
 Narra Venkateswara Rao
 Prasad Babu

Soundtrack

Awards
Nandi Awards
 Second Best Feature Film - Silver - Ramoji Rao (1989)
 Best Costume Designer -  Kondaiyya

References

External links

 

1989 films
1989 soundtrack albums
Indian teen drama films
1980s teen drama films
1980s Telugu-language films
Indian films based on actual events
Films about women in India
1989 drama films